is a former Japanese professional baseball player.

External links

1964 births
Living people
Chunichi Dragons players
Japanese baseball coaches
Japanese baseball players
Nippon Professional Baseball coaches
Seibu Lions players
Baseball people from Shimane Prefecture